Malaga is a census-designated place and unincorporated community in Eddy County, New Mexico, United States. Its population was 147 as of the 2010 census. Malaga has a post office with ZIP code 88263. U.S. Route 285 passes through the community. Formerly known as Kirkwell, Malaga was founded in the 1890s by Swiss immigrants and was named after the Spanish city of Málaga. Italian laborers were recruited to farm the area, and many settled in Malaga.

It is within the Carlsbad Municipal School District, which operates Carlsbad High School.

Malaga is on the Pecos Highway approximately 18 miles southeast of Carlsbad. The Pecos River flows past two miles east of the community.

Demographics

References

Census-designated places in New Mexico
Census-designated places in Eddy County, New Mexico